Anne Lacaton (born 2 August 1955) is a French architect and educator. She runs the architectural practice Lacaton & Vassal, with Jean-Philippe Vassal. The pair were jointly awarded the 2021 Pritzker Prize.

Early life and education 
She was born in Saint-Pardoux-la-Rivière on 2 August 1955. Lacaton graduated in architecture from the École nationale supérieure d'architecture et de paysage de Bordeaux and received a master's degree in urban planning from the University of Bordeaux in 1984. Lacaton often visited Vassal in Niger, who worked there as an architect and town planner; they built their first joint project, a straw hut.

Architectural practice 
In 1987, Lacaton formed the practice Lacaton & Vassal, with Jean-Philippe Vassal. Initially based in Bordeaux, the practice moved to Paris in 2000. Lacaton & Vassal's work focuses on reduced-cost construction. Many projects are hybrids between a contemporary building concept and more diverse techniques, upsetting building contractors' standard practices.

The firm renovated the Palais de Tokyo contemporary art museum in Paris, completed in 2001. The project, a bare bones reclamation of an art deco building near the Seine, was short-listed for the EU Mies Award in 2003.

In 2005, Lacaton & Vassal and architect Frédéric Druot were selected to reshape the Tour Bois le Prêtre, a 17-story housing tower on Paris' northern edge designed by architect Raymond Lopez in 1957. The team cut away most of the thick façade's panels, installing balconies and large sliding windows in their place, opening the apartments to more natural light. The units were also enlarged and opened, and the firm installed new plumbing, bathrooms, ventilation, and electric systems. The project was a runner up in the Design of the Year award from the UK's Design Museum in 2013, coming top of the architecture category.

The practice has also worked on the École Nationale Supérieure d’Architecture in Nantes; the art collection project FRAC Nord-Pas de Calais in Dunkirk; the Cap Ferret residential building in Cap Ferret, and the Grand Parc Bordeaux (with Frédéric Druot and Christophe Hutin). This last project was the winner of the EU Mies 2019 Award, for the best contemporary architecture in Europe.

Lacaton & Vassal have worked with Frederic Druot on sustainable housing projects, reinventing old 1960s era social housing in a project called Plus. Plus is an initiative to upgrade old social housing into better living spaces. They've published literature on the project.

Academic career 
Lacaton was visiting professor at the Higher Technical School of Architecture of Madrid (2007–13); EPFL (École Polytechnique Fédérale de Lausanne; 2004, 2006, 2010–11 and 2017–18); University of Florida (2012); State University of New York at Buffalo (2013); Pavillon Neuflize OBC-Palais de Tokyo, Paris (2013–14); and Harvard University. Lacaton was appointed as Associate Professor of Architecture & Design at ETH Zurich in 2017.

Her academic teaching focuses on an ideological and socio-political approach to architecture. Lacaton's designs and constructions support human use rather than iconic display, concerned with the people involved. Her designs aim to promote user participation, such as residents in areas undergoing redevelopment.

Anne Lacaton served as a jury member for The Daylight Award in 2020 and 2022.

Awards

Lacaton & Vassal
 Lauréats des Albums de la Jeune Architecture, France – 1991
 Grand Prix National d’Architecture Jeune Talent, France – 1999
 Erich Schelling Award − 2006
 Fondation Erich Schelling, Karlsruhe Award “Sustainability and Residential Innovation”, City of Madrid – 2006
 Royal Institute of British Architects International Fellowship in 2009.
 Grand prix national de l'architecture in 2008
 Paris, France Equerre d’Argent Award (with Frederic Druot) – 2011
 Paris Daylight & Building Components Award – 2011
 Design of the year, architecture category (with Frederic Druot) – 2013
 Rolf Schock Prize in the Visual Arts in 2014
 Life Time Achievement – Trienal de Arquitectura de Lisboa – 2016
 Académie de l’Architecture France – Gold Medal – 2016
 Simon Architecture Prize/ Fondation Mies Van der Rohe – The Living Places (with Frederic Druot) – 2016
 Heinrich Tessenow Medal in 2016
 Global Award for Sustainable Architecture (with Frederic Druot) in 2018
 Mies van der Rohe Award in 2019
 Pritzker Architecture Prize in 2021

References

External links 
Denis Bocquet, "'More Space, More Light, More Green: A New Vision of Social Housing'. A Dialogue with Anne Lacaton", Speech, 2014.
 – video interviews, philosophy, and work retrospective.

1955 births
Living people
20th-century French architects
21st-century French architects
French women architects
People from Dordogne
Pritzker Architecture Prize winners
University of Bordeaux alumni
20th-century French women
21st-century French women
Members of the Royal Swedish Academy of Arts